Eshaqabad, also rendered as Eshagh Abad, may refer to:

Esḩaqābād (اسحق آباد)
Eshaqabad, Isfahan
Eshaqabad, Shahr-e Babak, Kerman Province
Eshaqabad, Sirjan, Kerman Province
Eshaqabad, Nishapur, Razavi Khorasan Province
Eshaqabad, Nik Shahr, Sistan and Baluchestan Province
Eshaqabad Rural District, in Razavi Khorasan Province

Esḩāqābād (اسحاق آباد)
Eshaqabad, Kerman
Eshaqabad, Kurdistan
Eshaqabad, Lorestan
Eshaqabad, Kashmar, Razavi Khorasan Province
Eshaqabad, Sarbaz, Sistan and Baluchestan Province

See also
Eshqabad (disambiguation)